Eugen Piwowarsky (10 November 1891 – 17 November 1953) was a German metallurgist.

Piwowarsky was born in Leschnitz, Prussian Silesia, and educated at the Technische Hochschule Breslau. He taught at RWTH Aachen and died in Aachen.

Literary works 
 Hochwertiger Grauguss und die physikalisch-metallurgischen Grundlagen seiner Herstellung, 1929

1891 births
1953 deaths
German metallurgists
20th-century German chemists
Academic staff of RWTH Aachen University
People from the Province of Silesia
People from Strzelce County
Engineers from Aachen